Krishnaswami or Krishnaswamy is a South Indian name, and may refer to:

 A. A. Krishnaswami Ayyangar, mathematician
 A. Krishnaswamy, politician
 Alladi Krishnaswamy Iyer, lawyer
 K. A. Krishnaswamy, former minister of Tamil Nadu
 K. Subramanyam, film director
 Krishnaswami Alladi, mathematician
 Krishnaswami Iyengar, politician
 Krishnaswami Ramiah, geneticist
 Krishnaswami Srinivas Sanjivi, medical doctor
 Krishnaswamy Kasturirangan, space scientist
 Krishnaswamy Sundarji, former Chief of Army Staff of India
 Mani Krishnaswami, carnatic vocalist
 S. Krishnaswami Aiyangar, historian
 S. Krishnaswamy, filmmaker
 Sethunathasarma Krishnaswami, geochemist
 Srinivasapuram Krishnaswamy, former Chief of the Air Staff of India
 Uma Krishnaswami, writer of children's literature
 V. D. Krishnaswami, archaeologist
 V. Krishnaswamy Iyer, lawyer